Ramadan Miah Jame Mosque, or Ramzan Mia Jame Masjid, and more popularly known as Chowdhury Mosjid, is a mosque in the Noakhali District of Bangladesh. The existence of such an ancient mosque was not widely known to the general public until it was brought forward to Kabirhat's upazila nirbahi officer, Shariful Islam.

Location 
The mosque can be found in the village of Daulat Ramdi, located in Kabirhat Upazila's No. 7 Bataiya Union Parishad.

History 
The three-domed mosque was built during the Mughal Era and is over 300 years old. It was established by Shaykh Noor Ullah Chowdhury and Shaykh Mujeer Ullah Chowdhury, the ancestors of the current chairman of the mosque, Khwaja Mu'in ad-Din Chowdhury.

Gallery

References 

Noakhali District
Mosques in Bangladesh
Mughal mosques